Narvik is a town and the administrative centre of Narvik Municipality in Nordland county, Norway. The town is located along the Ofotfjorden in the Ofoten region. The town lies on a peninsula located between the Rombaken fjord and the Beisfjorden. The European route E06 highway runs through the Beisfjord Bridge and Hålogaland Bridge crossing the two small fjords surrounding the town.

Narvik Church is the main church for the town. Narvik is a commercial centre for the region. Narvik University College has approximately 1,200 students. There are some high-tech businesses in Narvik (among them Natech).

Etymology
Narvik is named after the old Narvik farm ("Narduigh" – 1567), since the town is built on its ground.

The Old Norse form of the port was probably *Knarravík. The first element is the genitive pluralis of knarr which means 'merchant ship' and the last element is vík meaning 'inlet'. The name Knarravík (modern forms Knarvik or Narvik) is found in several places along the Norwegian coast (and three places in the old Norwegian province of Bohuslän) and it tends to refer to good and natural ports.

The port was once called Victoriahavn after Queen Victoria of the United Kingdom, though Sweden's Crown Princess Victoria was also honoured.

History

The history of Narvik as a settlement began in the Bronze Age. Not very much is known about these people, but the Vikings lived in this area.

Narvik was developed as an all-year ice free port for the Swedish Kiruna and Gällivare iron mines. The history of modern Narvik begins in the 1870s, when the Swedish government began to understand the potential of the iron ore mines in Kiruna, Sweden. Obtaining iron ore from Kiruna had one significant problem in that there was no suitable Swedish port. The nearest Swedish port, Luleå, had limitations. It was covered with ice all winter, far from Kiruna, and allows only medium-sized bulk freight vessels. The Swedish company (Gällivare Aktiebolag) built the Iron Ore Line (Malmbanan) to Riksgränsen on the Norway–Sweden border. The Norwegian Ofotbanen railway line connects Narvik to the Swedish border.

Swedish mining corporation LKAB still ships the majority of its ore from Narvik (a total 25 million tons a year). The corporation is still important in the area, both as an employer and landowner, although its influence is not as prominent now as it has been in previous years.

The town of Narvik was established on 1 January 1902 when the village of Narvik received status as a proper town and was separated from the large municipality of Ankenes so it could have its own municipal government. Initially, the town-municipality of Narvik had 3,705 residents. On 1 January 1974, the municipality of Ankenes was merged with the town-municipality of Narvik, forming a new, larger municipality of Narvik.

World War II

The port of Narvik proved to be strategically valuable in the early years of World War II and the town became a focal point of the Norwegian Campaign. In 1939, Germany's war industry depended upon iron ore mined in Kiruna and Malmberget in Sweden. During the summer season, this ore could be sent by cargo ship to Germany through the Baltic Sea via the Swedish port of Luleå on the Gulf of Bothnia. However, when the Gulf of Bothnia froze during the winter, more shipments of the ore needed to be transported through Narvik and, from there, down the west coast of Norway to Germany. The town of Narvik is linked by rail to Sweden, but not to any other towns in Norway. As a result, Narvik serves as a gateway to the ore fields of Sweden that cannot be easily reached from southern Norway via land. Winston Churchill realised that the control of Narvik meant stopping most German imports of iron ore during the winter of 1940. This would be advantageous to the Allies and it might help shorten the war. Equally as important, later in the war, German submarines and warships based there threatened the allied supply line to the Soviet Union.

Churchill proposed laying a naval minefield in Norwegian territorial waters around Narvik (referred to as "the Leads") or else occupying the town with Allied troops. The Allies hoped that they might be able to use an occupied Narvik as a base from which to secure the Swedish ore fields and/or to send supplies and reinforcements to Finland, then fighting the Finnish Winter War with the Soviet Union. Plans to lay a minefield around Narvik or to seize the town met with debate within the British government – since both plans would mean a violation of Norway's neutrality and sovereignty.

Finally, on 8 April 1940, the British Admiralty launched Operation Wilfred, an attempt to lay anti-shipping minefields around Narvik in Norwegian territorial waters. Coincidentally, Germany launched its invasion of Norway (Operation Weserübung) the next day. During this invasion, ten German destroyers, each carrying 200 mountain infantry soldiers, were sent to Narvik. The outdated Norwegian coastal defence ships  and  attempted to resist the invasion, but both were sunk after a short and uneven battle. The Royal Navy quickly dispatched several ships to Narvik, including the battleship  and during the Battles of Narvik, the British took control of the coast, destroying the German destroyers that had brought the invasion force to Narvik, as well as other German ships in the area.

On 12 April 1940, the first convoys of Allied soldiers were sent under Major-General Pierse Joseph Mackesy to Narvik. The Admiralty urged Mackesy to conduct an assault on Narvik from the sea as soon as possible. However, Mackesy believed that the German harbour defences were too strong for such an invasion to take place. The Admiralty argued that a naval bombardment of Norway would enable the troops to land safely, but General Mackesy refused to subject Norwegian citizens to such a bombardment and instead he chose to land his troops near Narvik and wait until the snow melted to take over the town.

Coordinated by the Norwegian General Carl Gustav Fleischer, Norwegian, French, Polish and British forces recaptured Narvik on 28 May 1940. This is also considered the first Allied infantry victory in World War II. However, by that time, the Allies were losing the Battle of France and the evacuation from Dunkirk was underway. Since the Nazi German invasion of France had made Scandinavia largely irrelevant and, since the valuable troops assigned to Narvik were badly needed elsewhere, the Allies withdrew from Narvik on 8 June 1940 in Operation Alphabet. The same day, while operating in the Narvik area, the German battleships  and  sank the British aircraft carrier  during the withdrawal from this battle. Without support from the Allied naval task force, the Norwegians were outnumbered and they had to lay down their arms in Norway on 10 June 1940. This was not a complete capitulation, since the Norwegians kept on fighting guerrilla operations inland.

Possession of the Ofotfjord was also important to the German Kriegsmarine (navy) since it provided a refuge for warships like the "pocket battleship"  and the battleship  outside the range (at the time) of air attacks from Scotland. Also, U-boats could possibly be based at Narvik.

See also
List of towns and cities in Norway

References

Narvik
Cities and towns in Norway
Populated places in Nordland
Populated places of Arctic Norway
1902 establishments in Norway
Port cities and towns in Norway